This is a partial list of actors who have played the role of a real or fictitious president of the United States.

Presidents who played themselves

Films

 Reagan and Trump were not President at the time.

Television

 Was not President at the time.

Actors who played actual presidents

Documentaries

Films

Television

Video games

Theatre

Online
Only speaking/performing roles in non-televised productions with over 5 million views are included.

Male actors who played fictional presidents

Films

Television

Video games

Actresses who played fictional presidents

Films

Television

Video games

Awards

Real presidents

Awards by president portrayed

Academy Awards

Critics' Choice Movie Awards

Critics' Choice Television Awards

Golden Globe Awards

MTV Movie Awards

Primetime Emmy Awards

Satellite Awards

Screen Actors Guild Awards

TCA Awards

Tony Awards

Fictional presidents

Academy Awards

Critics' Choice Television Awards

Golden Globe Awards

MTV Movie Awards

People's Choice Awards

Primetime Emmy Awards

Satellite Awards

Screen Actors Guild Awards

TCA Awards

References

President of the United States
Actors
Actors